Gabon Airlines is the name of two incarnations of Gabonese airline, headquartered in Libreville. The first incarnation of Gabon Airlines which was operated from 2007 to 2012, concentrating on African and European flight services out of Libreville International Airport. In April 2015, the second incarnation of Gabon Airlines is due to redeveloped as a flag carrier, replacing the original Air Gabon. As of December 2019, however, the new airline has yet to commence operations.

History

After having been granted official permission by the Gabonese transport minister on 8 November 2006, the airline was founded in 2007 by private investors, banks and insurers, the CEO being Christian Bongo Ondimba, a son of former Gabonese president Omar Bongo. The first revenue flight of Gabon Airlines took place on 11 April 2007 and went from Libreville to Paris. Flights to South Africa and other Central African countries followed suit.

Relaunch
In April 2015, when the Gabonese government and Air France Consulting signed an agreement to manage the redeveloped national flag carrier, planned to be launched as early as June 2015. The new carrier  will operate initially domestic and international flights with a fleet of about unspecified airplanes.

Destinations
As of December 2018 Gabon Airlines operates scheduled flights to the following destinations:

Douala – Douala International Airport

Kinshasa – N'djili Airport 

Pointe Noire – Pointe Noire Airport 
Brazzaville – Maya-Maya Airport 

Libreville – Libreville International Airport hub 
Port-Gentil – Port-Gentil International Airport 

Accra – Kotoka International Airport 

Abidjan – Port Bouet Airport 

Nairobi – Jomo Kenyatta International Airport 

Abuja – Nnamdi Azikiwe International Airport 
Lagos – Murtala Muhammed International Airport 

Johannesburg – OR Tambo International Airport

Fleet

Former fleet 

Currently, As of December 2018 the Gabon Airlines fleet consists of the following aircraft with an average age of 22.8 years:
ATR 72-500 (1)
Boeing 737-300 (1)
Total: 2

References

External links

 Official website
Official website 

Defunct airlines of Gabon
Airlines established in 2007
Airlines disestablished in 2012
Airlines established in 2015
Airlines formerly banned in the European Union
Gabonese companies established in 2007
Companies based in Libreville
Gabonese companies established in 2015